Jackson Row was an African-American slum in Atlanta. Author Ray Stannard Baker described the area in 1907 in language that is offensive to current sensibilities, but nonetheless provides one of the few existing descriptions of the area:

One of a number of black settlements in Atlanta. Small, dilapidated houses crowded into irregular alleys are filled with negroes, many of them widows with children, who make a living by serving white families. These negroes are all near the edge of poverty, descending sometimes into crime, but living a happy-go-lucky life.

References

African-American history in Atlanta
Former shantytowns and slums in Atlanta